Dowlatabad (also Romanized as Dowlatābād; also known as Daulatābād and Dovletābād) is a village in Dowlatabad Rural District of the Central District of Marand County, East Azerbaijan province, Iran. At the 2006 National Census, its population was 3,864 in 976 households. The following census in 2011 counted 3,728 people in 1,087 households. The latest census in 2016 showed a population of 3,868 people in 1,185 households; it was the largest village in its rural district.

References 

Marand County

Populated places in East Azerbaijan Province

Populated places in Marand County